Renato Villalta (born 3 February 1955 in Maserada sul Piave, province of Treviso) is a former professional basketball player from Italy. At a height of 2.04 m (6'8 ") tall, and a weight of 102 kg (225 lbs), he played at the power forward and center positions. He was inducted into the Italian Basketball Hall of Fame, in 2013.

Professional career
Villalta was a member of the FIBA European Selection, in 1980 and 1981.

National team career
Villalta won the silver medal with the senior Italian national basketball team, at the 1980 Moscow Summer Olympic Games.

References

External links
FIBA Profile
FIBA Europe Profile

1955 births
Living people
Basketball players at the 1980 Summer Olympics
Basketball players at the 1984 Summer Olympics
Basket Mestre 1958 players
Centers (basketball)
FIBA EuroBasket-winning players
Italian men's basketball players
1978 FIBA World Championship players
Medalists at the 1980 Summer Olympics
Olympic basketball players of Italy
Olympic medalists in basketball
Olympic silver medalists for Italy
Pallacanestro Treviso players
Sportspeople from the Province of Treviso
Power forwards (basketball)
Virtus Bologna players
1986 FIBA World Championship players